Suseong District (Suseong-gu) is a gu (district) in southeastern Daegu, South Korea. It is one of the most prosperous and high-density areas of Daegu, and is the site of the city's most extensive hagwon district. The population of this district consists of those who have careers such as doctors, professors, judges and other high valued careers in Korea. Because of this, it is known for expensive housing and schools compared to other districts in Daegu.

Suseong-gu shares its eastern border with Gyeongsan city, and looks across the Sincheon stream at Nam-gu and Jung-gu towards the city center. To the north it meets Dong-gu and to the south it faces Dalseong-gun across the ridgeline of Yongjibong.

Attractions in the district include Yongjibong and Suseong Lake, as well as the Sincheon riverside park. The district enjoys close connections to both downtown Daegu and neighboring Gyeongsan.

Education
Dukwon High School (1978)

References

External links

Official English-language site

 
Districts of Daegu